Rhagovelia espriella is a species of aquatic bug first found in La Espriella, Tumaco, Nariño, Colombia.

References

Further reading
 Padilla-Gil, DORA NANCY. "Ten new species of Rhagovelia in the angustipes complex (Hemiptera: Heteroptera: Veliidae) from Colombia, with a key to the Colombian species." Zootaxa 4059.1 (2014): 71-95.

Veliidae
Hemiptera of South America
Insects described in 2011